Kalansongoia Chiefdom is a formerly amalgamated chiefdom in Tonkolili District of Sierra Leone. Its capital was Bumbuna. Now, the Chiefdom has been de-amalgamated into the original Kalanthuba and Dansogoia chiefdoms. Bumbuna remains the capital of the Dansogoia chiefdom. Kalanthuba has both a traditional capital and a capital of governance. The traditional capital is Kasokira and the administrative capital is Kamankay. Kamankay lies directly across the river from Bumbuna.

References 

Chiefdoms of Sierra Leone
Northern Province, Sierra Leone